Javier Calleja Revilla (born 12 May 1978) is a Spanish retired footballer who played mainly as a left midfielder, currently manager of Levante UD.

He amassed La Liga totals of 192 matches and nine goals over one decade, mainly with Villarreal (six seasons) and Osasuna (three). He also represented Málaga in the competition, in a professional career which lasted 16 years.

Calleja later managed Villarreal, his first stint being in 2017.

Playing career
After growing unsuccessfully through the ranks of Real Madrid and making his professional debut with lowly UD Almería, Alcalá de Henares-born Calleja signed with Villarreal CF, but spent some months with its farm team CD Onda. He made his first-team debut in the second division, playing nine games in the 1999–2000 campaign as the side returned to La Liga and contributing one goal, in the 3–1 away loss against CA Osasuna.

Calleja was a very important member for the Yellow Submarine in his first three seasons in that tier, scoring four goals in 35 matches in 2001–02. On 5 April 2003, he netted a penalty kick as a late substitute in a 2–0 home win over FC Barcelona, dedicating the goal to his mother who had died hours before. However, the emergence of Santi Cazorla and two consecutive serious knee injuries limited him to just 25 appearances over the following three campaigns.

Ahead of 2006–07, Calleja left Villarreal and joined Málaga CF. He was an instant first choice in Andalusia, making 38 appearances in his second season as the club returned to the top flight after a two-year hiatus.

After a serious injury to teammate Adriano Rossato, Calleja spent much of the following campaign playing as left-back. On 12 June 2009, after his contract with Málaga expired, he moved to Osasuna in a 2+1 years deal.

Coaching career
In September 2012, 34-year-old Calleja announced his retirement and immediately returned to his former club Villarreal, being appointed manager of the youth sides. On 9 May 2017, he replaced Paco López at the helm of the reserves.

Calleja was named manager of the first team on 25 September 2017, in place of fired Fran Escribá. In his first season he led them to the fifth position, with the subsequent qualification to the group stage of the UEFA Europa League. On 20 May 2018, he extended his contract.

On 10 December 2018, with the side just three points above the relegation zone and having managed only one win in the last nine league fixtures, Calleja was dismissed. On 29 January 2019, however, he was reinstated in the post following the sacking of Luis García. He left in July 2020, after a late run of form won the team a fifth-place finish and European qualification. 

On 5 April 2021, Calleja was appointed coach of last-placed Deportivo Alavés on a short-term deal. Having achieved his target of avoiding relegation, he was rewarded with a two-year contract the following month. He left at the turn of the calendar year with the Basque club in the relegation zone, having taken one point from the last 15 and been eliminated from the second round of the Copa del Rey by third-tier Linares Deportivo.

Calleja was named manager of Levante UD on 16 October 2022.

Personal life
Calleja's brother Fernando, who was born over a decade after him, was also a footballer but never any higher than the third division.

Managerial statistics

Honours

Player
Villarreal
UEFA Intertoto Cup: 2003, 2004

References

External links

1978 births
Living people
People from Alcalá de Henares
Spanish footballers
Footballers from the Community of Madrid
Association football midfielders
Association football utility players
La Liga players
Segunda División players
Segunda División B players
Tercera División players
Real Madrid C footballers
UD Almería players
RSD Alcalá players
Villarreal CF players
Málaga CF players
CA Osasuna players
Spain youth international footballers
Spanish football managers
La Liga managers
Segunda División managers
Segunda División B managers
Villarreal CF B managers
Villarreal CF managers
Deportivo Alavés managers
Levante UD managers